Omar Abdel Meguid (born February 23, 1988 in Giza) is a professional squash player who represented Egypt. He reached a career-high world ranking of World No. 25 in November 2014.

References

External links 
 
 
 

Egyptian male squash players
Living people
1988 births
Sportspeople from Giza
21st-century Egyptian people